The Italy national rugby league team represents Italy in rugby league football. With origins dating back to the 1950s and 1960s, the team has competed regularly in international competitions since 2008, when their current governing body, the Federazione Italiana Rugby League, was formed. They are currently ranked 16th in the IRL World Rankings.

History
In 1950, a team from Turin toured the North of England. Italy later started a domestic competition. A year later the first official match of the Italian national team took place in Cahors, France. Italy lost 29–17 although the Azzurri ended the first half leading 10–7.

Sixteen official matches were played against English teams in the season 1952–53, as well as a triangular tournament between Italy, France and England.

In 1958, in Treviso under the Italian Federation of Amateur Rugby 13 (FIAR 13) was formed and was recognised by the Rugby Football League. With this recognition and funding from England, the sport of rugby league became popular in Italy. In their first year, the FIAR had 24 clubs and 620 players.

In 1960, Italy played Australia in two international matches held in Italy, the results were 37–15 and 67–22 losses. In the late 1960s, threats made by the rugby union governing body, the Italian Rugby Federation, to ban players who played rugby league from their sport had the effect of killing off the sport in Italy by the 1970s. As a consequence the Italian national team ceased to exist.

In the mid-1990s the team were revived by two Italian-Australians, Domenic Pezzano and John Benigni, known as 'The Italian Rugby League A XIII' (IRL A XIII) was formed in 1993.
Pezzano coached Italy in the Coca-Cola Rugby League World Sevens in Australia with the team being predominantly players from Italy and one Italo-Australian player captained the team – Orazio D'Arrò in this tournament, Pezzano also coached the Italian team that participated in the first ever Super League World Nines tournament which was hosted by Fiji, that team was made up of Italian players, Italian Origin players and included 1st Graders such as Dean Schifilliti, Mark Corvo, Luke Davico and Italian dual international Orazio Arancio.

After that event, the Italia Rugby League began competing in various international tournaments, such as the Super League rugby league nines tournament in Fiji, World Sevens, St.Marys Sevens, Wollogong Sevens and the Mediterranean Cup in 1999. They attempted to qualify for the 2000 Rugby League World Cup and ended up in the Rugby League Emerging Nations Tournament in which they were runners-up to British Amateur Rugby League Association.

In 2002, the Azzurri were back playing internationals in Italy with a triangular tournament featuring Scotland and Russia. Italy lost to Tatarstan of Russia but tied their second game with Scotland 16 all. In 2003 Italy played Scotland again and contested the Ionio Cup against Greece, which they won.

In 2006, Italy played three matches, two against South Africa and one against British Amateur Rugby League Association.

The Federazione of Italia Rugby League was officially moved to the "official observer" status by the Rugby League European Federation from an unranked position on 15 April 2008.

Italy won the RLEF European Shield in 2008 and 2009, and as such were drafted into the 2009 European Cup following Russia's withdrawal from the tournament. During this tournament, Italy were handed their record defeat by Scotland, but they did manage to record one victory, over Serbia at The Old Parish in Maesteg, Wales.

In Autumn 2010 Italy embarked on a short tour of Wales, culminating in a match in Wrexham on 6 October in which they faced Wales for the first time in a full Rugby League international. The Italian side obtained a remarkable 13–6 victory, the first against a national team of the British Isles.

In 2013 they won a warm up match against 3rd ranked England 15–14 making it their most stunning victory.

2013 World Cup qualifying

In 2011, Italy contested the qualifying tournament for the 2013 Rugby League World Cup, competing against Russia, Serbia and Lebanon. Coached by Carlo Napolitano and captained by Anthony Minichiello, Italy's draw with Lebanon was enough for them to gain the 14th and final place in the 2013 World Cup.

2013 World Cup

Italy were drawn in Pool C alongside Scotland, Tonga and they also played an inter-group match against co-hosts Wales. Their tournament began with an upset victory over the co-hosts at Cardiff's Millennium Stadium. In their second match, the 'Azzuri' took on Scotland who were coming off an upset win of their own against Tonga. The match turned out to be a thriller and it was tight with a high scoring draw being the result. Italy then had to just win their last pool match against Tonga after Scotland won their match and finished their pool-stage campaign with the same points differential the Italians were currently on. Tonga had nothing but pride to play for after their hopes of qualification had vanished but they shocked Napolitano's men by keeping them scoreless and therefore eliminating Italy from having any chance to play in the 2013 World Cup knockout round.

2017 World Cup qualifying

Italy participated in the qualification for the 2017 Rugby League World Cup. The first stage of qualifying involved having to finish in the top 3 in their 2014–15 European Shield competition. Italy only managed to secure qualification for the 'final qualification tournament' after winning their second to last game against bottom placed Ukraine. Italy finished the Shield in third place with 3 wins and 3 defeats in six matches.

The final qualification tournament consisted of 6 teams - the top three teams from the European B tournament, the winners of the European C tournament and seeded nations Wales and Ireland. The tournament featured two groups of three teams playing in a single round-robin format. The winners of each group qualified for the World Cup, while the runners-up faced each other in a play-off match on 5 November 2016 to determine the final spot. A seeded draw took place to determine the groups on 5 November 2015. Italy are placed in Group A alongside European B tournament champions Serbia, and Wales.

2021 Rugby League World Cup
Italy started off their World Cup campaign with a 28-4 victory over Scotland. This was followed by heavy defeats against Fiji and Australia which left Italy third in the group which meant their elimination from the tournament.

Players

Current squad
Squad selected for 2021 Rugby League World Cup.

Notable representatives 
The following is a list of Italian representative players who have played 50 more or matches in a professional rugby league competition i.e. the National Rugby League and/or the Super League:
 Daniel Alvaro
 Nathan Brown
 Terry Campese
 Mason Cerruto
 Cameron Ciraldo
 Aidan Guerra
 Anthony Laffranchi
 Josh Mantellato
 Anthony Minichiello
 Mark Minichiello
 Joel Riethmuller
 Brenden Santi
 Kade Snowden
 James Tedesco
 Paul Vaughan
 Paul Franze
 Shannon Donato
 David Penna
 Mark Corvo
 Luke Davico

Results and fixtures

Recent results

Competitions
The Italian team has competed in the following matches and tournaments since the reintroduction of rugby league to the country in the 1990s:
 World Sevens in 1995, 1997, plus the qualification tournament in 2003
 Superleague World Nines in 1996
 Emerging Nations Tournament in 2000
 Ionio Cup vs Greece in 2003 and 2004
 St.Mary's World Sevens - Australia
 Wollongong Sevens - Australia
 Columbus Cup vs United States in 2006
 Australian-Mediterranean Shield in 2009
 World Cup qualifying for the 2000 tournament

Since 2008, Italy has competed in the following Test match tournaments:
 European Shield in 2008, 2009, and 2012–13
 European Cup in 2009
 World Cup in 2013 and 2017, and their respective qualifying tournaments held in 2011 and 2016

International record and ranking

Italy's competitive record as of 23 December 2020

Kits
Italy's kit suppliers are FI-TA.

See also

 Rugby league in Italy
 Veneto 9s
 Italy national rugby union team

Notes

References

External links
 Official Website
 FIRFL Website
 Med Cup

 
National rugby league teams